Işıl Yücesoy (born 2 October 1945) is a Turkish movie and theatre actress and singer.

Life
Işıl Yücesoy was born in Kırklareli, Turkey on 2 October 1945. Her father Selahattin was a music teacher, and she learned piano playing from her father. After she finished the high school, she studied drama at Ankara State Conservatory, and graduated in 1969. On 1 July 1989, she married Tayfun Cılızoğlu. She has a daughter named Meneviş. In 2016, she moved to the United States to join her daughter, who lives in New York City.

Music career
Between 1969 and 1975, she was performing for the Turkish State Theatres. She then focused on music and resigned from the theatre to go on the stage as a singer. She performed in many nightclubs. Her repertoire consisted mostly of Turkish covers of western pop music. She also sang in English, Italian and Russian music. In one of her 45-rmp records, there is a composition of Selami Şahin, a Turkish composer. In 1978, she established her own record label Orient.

She then got interested in television and cinema. She played in many television serials and films.

Discography

45 rpms and singles

Albums (LP and CD)
Her albums are the following:
1979: Bir Evet Yeter
2005: En İyileriyle Işıl Yücesoy
2016: Zamansız
2021: Sezen Aksu Sokağı
2021: Vefa (remake) (EP)

Filmography

References

Living people
1945 births
People from Kırklareli
Ankara State Conservatory alumni
Turkish film actresses
Turkish television actresses
Turkish women singers
Turkish pop singers